Jacques Van Lancker (born 21 September 1949) is a Belgian wrestler. He competed at the 1976 Summer Olympics and the 1980 Summer Olympics.

References

External links
 

1949 births
Living people
Belgian male sport wrestlers
Olympic wrestlers of Belgium
Wrestlers at the 1976 Summer Olympics
Wrestlers at the 1980 Summer Olympics
Sportspeople from Antwerp